Willem du Toit (born 18 March 1981) is a South African cricketer. He played in 19 first-class and 22 List A matches for Boland and Cape Cobras from 1998 to 2009.

References

External links
 

1981 births
Living people
South African cricketers
Boland cricketers
Cape Cobras cricketers
Cricketers from Cape Town